In the 2017 dengue epidemic in Sri Lanka, a rise in the number of dengue fever cases was reported on the island country of Sri Lanka. The peak of the outbreak was in the mid-year monsoon rain season, when there was record of over 40,000 cases in July. This figure was far beyond the historical highest number of cases per month in Sri Lanka. Year end total dengue cases rose to 186,101.

Most cases (43%) were recorded in Western Province urban areas such as the Colombo district (table 1). Most dengue cases were young people and school children. Year end Sri Lanka's total dengue related deaths was 440.

The Government of Sri Lanka spend more than US$12 million on outbreak control and was supported by NGOs such as the Red Cross.

Background 
In 2017 Sri Lanka experienced its largest neglected tropical disease outbreak of dengue fever since the first recorded Sri Lankan case in 1962. This biological hazard, transmitted via female mosquito bites, caused 186,101 dengue cases, significantly higher than in previous years (table 2), and 440 deaths.

 
 
Sri Lanka's Ministry of Health (MoH) reported a rise in cases from January, with the highest number of cases reported in July (table 3). Most cases were recorded in the west and north of the country, specifically in the urban Colombo district.

Causes

Climate 

 Sri Lanka's tropical climate offers prime mosquito breeding conditions.
 The 2017 monsoon rains (May–August) coincided with the peak of the dengue outbreak (table 2). Triggering floods and disrupting refuse collection, increasing mosquito breedings sites.
 However, annual rainfall and El Nino conditions were lower on average than previous years, suggesting that climate was not completely responsible for the outbreak.

Political 

 MoH failed to prepare and take appropriate mosquito vector control.
 Insufficiencies in the virologic surveillance programme failed to identify dengue serotypes and genotypes. Leaving Sri Lanka unprepared for new strains (DENV-2), for which their population would have little immunity.

Socio-economic 

 Sri Lanka is a middle-income country with a GDP per capita of US $12,600 (2017). This restricts investment in healthcare infrastructure resulting in an overstretched healthcare system.
 High urban population density in western districts created higher probability of transmission.
 In 2017, 42% of Sri Lankans were in extreme poverty (below US$5.50 a day) which limits a family's access to healthcare and increases risk of disease.
 Regional disparities, due to the Sri Lankan civil conflict (1983-2009), displaced people to IDP camps and marginalised ethnic groups (Tamils) in north and eastern districts, reducing support and increasing disease risk.

Short- and long-term impacts

Short-term impacts 

 Unexpected high death toll.
Disruption to workplaces, household income, and education as the majority of cases were of people aged 10–29. 
Direct and indirect impacts of the dengue outbreak affected 600,000 people, in all 25 districts, prominently in urban areas. However, some districts may have been under-reported due to ethnic marginalisation and the presence of IDP camps.
Dengue treatment strained national economic resources costing Sri Lanka US $12.7 million (LKR 1.938 billion).

Long-term impacts 

 Today dengue cases are declining in Sri Lanka, with 25,067 total cases in 2021 (table 1).
 Dengue is still present with new strains (serotypes DENV-3 and DENV-4) becoming more prominent threatening future outbreaks.
 Combined with the COVID-19 pandemic there is still immense pressures on healthcare and trade networks.
 2022 has seen an economic crisis and severe food insecurity in Sri Lanka, the dengue outbreak would be a contributing factor.

Futures 
Climate change models suggest that Sri Lanka's climate is becoming more conducive to mosquito breeding, this combined with economic instability could trigger a future epidemic. There is a possibility of a cycle of disease, poverty and food insecurity which may be challenging to break. However, this could be mitigated if the MoH, supported by institutions like WHO, engage in proactive strategies. At the cost of US$78 per person a licensed vaccine is now available  Dengvaxia® (CYD-TDV) with five more in development. However, Sri Lanka's current expenditure is US$161 per capita on healthcare (2021), the vaccine is a significant proportion of that budget and in uncertain economic times may not be a priority.

See also 
 Dengue fever outbreaks
 Neglected Tropical Diseases
 Tropical disease
 Mosquito-borne disease

External links 
 WHO: Sri Lanka
 Ministry of Health - Sri Lanka
 Epidemiology Unit

References 

Dengue
2017 disease outbreaks
Sri Lanka 2017
Disease outbreaks in Sri Lanka
2017 disasters in Sri Lanka